Ernest Joseph Perry IV (born August 26, 1998) is an American football quarterback for the Houston Texans of the National Football League (NFL). He played college football at Boston College and Brown.

Early life and high school
Perry grew up in Andover, Massachusetts and attended Andover High School. He played football at Andover for his father, EJ Perry III, and was a four-year starter at quarterback. Perry set the single-game state record for passing yards with 636 during his junior season and was featured in Sports Illustrated'''s Faces in the Crowd. As a senior, Perry was named the Boston Globe'' Division 1 Player of the Year after he passed for 3,398 yards and 47 touchdowns, which tied the state record, and also rushed for 1,006 rushing yards and 13 touchdowns. He finished his high school career with 8,712 passing yards and 114 touchdown passes, both of which are second in Massachusetts high school history. Perry committed to play college football at Boston College over FBS offers from UMass and Ohio and from FCS schools New Hampshire, Holy Cross, Monmouth, Bryant, Yale, Dartmouth, Brown and Columbia.

College career
Perry began his collegiate career at Boston College and joined the team as an early enrollee. He played in one game as a freshman but did not throw a pass. As a sophomore, Perry played in five games and completed 27 of 39 passes for 277 yards and two touchdowns. Following the end of the season, Perry announced that he would be transferring to Brown where his uncle, James Perry had recently been named head coach.

Perry was named the Brown Bears starting quarterback going into his first season with the team. He was named first-team All-Ivy League after completing 251 of 418 pass attempts for 2,948 yards and 22 touchdowns with 13 interceptions and also leading the team with 730 rushing yards with eight touchdowns. He also played basketball for Brown following the season. Perry's initial senior season in 2020 was canceled due to Covid-19.

In 2021, Perry won the Bushnell Cup as the Ivy League’s top offensive player and was again named first-team all-conference after completing 295 of 444 attempts for 3,033 yards and 23 touchdowns against 14 interceptions and rushing for 402 yards and seven touchdowns. He also won The George H. "Bulger" Lowe Award by the Gridiron Club of Greater Boston as the best offensive player in New England and was a finalist for the Walter Payton Award. After the conclusion of his college career, Perry was invited to play in the 2022 East–West Shrine Bowl. He completed 13-of-18 passing attempts for 241 yards and three touchdowns and also rushed for two two-point conversions and was named the game's offensive MVP.

College statistics

Professional career
Perry participated in the 2022 NFL Combine and received the highest overall athleticism score of any quarterback invited. Leading up to the draft he worked out with New England Patriots quarterbacks Mac Jones and Jarrett Stidham at Edge Performance Systems in Foxborough, Massachusetts.

Jacksonville Jaguars
Perry initially agreed to terms for a contract with the Philadelphia Eagles as an undrafted free agent shortly after the conclusion of the 2022 NFL Draft. However, he opted not to sign with the team after the Eagles signed quarterback Carson Strong and instead signed a contract with the Jacksonville Jaguars on May 3, 2022. On July 24, 2022 the Jaguars released Perry with a non-football injury designation. He was re-signed by the Jaguars on August 9, 2022. Perry was waived a second time on August 30, 2022, during final roster cuts and re-signed to the practice squad. He signed a reserve/future contract with the Jaguars on January 23, 2023. He was waived on March 7, 2023.

Houston Texans
On March 8, 2023, Perry was claimed off waivers by the Houston Texans.

Personal life
Another uncle of Perry's, John Perry, is also a football coach and was previously the head coach at Merrimack College. John also was a receiver coach for the Houston Texans.

References

External links
Jacksonville Jaguars bio
Boston College Eagles bio
Brown Bears bio

1998 births
Living people
Players of American football from Massachusetts
Sportspeople from Essex County, Massachusetts
American football quarterbacks
Brown Bears football players
Boston College Eagles football players
People from Andover, Massachusetts
Brown Bears men's basketball players
Jacksonville Jaguars players
Houston Texans players